António José Martins Seguro (born 11 March 1962) is a Portuguese politician for the Socialist Party (PS). Seguro was Secretary General of the PS from 2011 until September 2014, and he was the leader of the largest opposition party in the Portuguese Parliament.

Early life and education
Seguro was born on 11 March 1962 in Penamacor. He entered politics at a very young age and became a member of the Portuguese Socialist Party (PS) as a youth. He attended the 1st cycle program in business organization and management at the ISCTE – Lisbon University Institute, but he did not graduate. Seguro has a degree in international relations awarded later by the Autonomous University of Lisbon.

Career
Seguro became involved in political activities from a very young age, always linked to the Socialist Party (PS). He was successively secretary general of Socialist Youth, president of the National Youth Council and chairman of the Youth Forum of the European Communities. He was first elected to the Portuguese Parliament in 1991, and again eight years later. In 1995, the Socialist Party won the parliamentary elections, leaving the leader António Guterres to form a government. Seguro initially was Secretary of State for Youth and later assistant secretary of State's prime minister. After a cabinet reshuffle he was promoted to Deputy Minister of the Prime Minister.
He also played the role of coordinator of the Standing Committee of the Portuguese Socialist Party and president of the Municipal Assembly of Penamacor. In 1999, António Guterres's PS again won the legislative elections and formed the XIV Constitutional Government, but Seguro moved to other functions. The former cabinet member was elected deputy to the European Parliament, between July 1999 and July 2001. In these two years, serving in the parliament, he was an effective member of the Committee on Constitutional Affairs (in these functions he was co-author of the Report on the Treaty of Nice and the Future of the European Union) and a substitute for the Commission for Employment and Social Affairs. He was also president of the Delegation for Relations with Central America and Mexico, vice president of the Socialist Group in the European Parliament and president of the Portuguese Socialist delegation. After leaving Parliament, he returned to the parliament, being reelected in the elections of 2002. He was also appointed member of the National Secretariat of the Socialist Party. After the municipal elections of December 2002, he accumulated these positions with membership in the Municipal Assembly of Gouveia.

After Prime Minister José Sócrates resigned as PS General Secretary on the election night of 5 June 2011, having lost the general election by a margin higher than expected, Seguro was elected leader of the party on 23 July 2011, winning 68% of the vote; his challenger, Francisco Assis, got 32%.

Electoral history

PS leadership election, 2011

  (Source: Official results)

PS leadership election, 2013

  (Source: Official results)

PS prime ministerial primary election, 2014

  (Source:)

References

1962 births
Living people
People from Penamacor
Socialist Party (Portugal) politicians
Government ministers of Portugal
Members of the Assembly of the Republic (Portugal)
MEPs for Portugal 1999–2004
Socialist Party (Portugal) MEPs